M1901 may refer to:

 Steyr Mannlicher M1901 pistol
 Winchester M1901 shotgun
 M1901 disappearing carriage, designation of the US Board of Fortifications
 F28 Sight M1901 variant, see List of U.S. Army fire control and sighting material by supply catalog designation
 Ehrhardt 7.5 cm Model 1901, Artillery used by the Norwegian Army